The Great Bank Robbery may refer to:

 The Great Bank Robbery (1913 film), Danish silent film, originally released as Gorki
 The Great Bank Robbery (1969 film), American Western comedy film